Tut District is a district of Adıyaman Province of Turkey. Its seat is the town Tut. Its area is 290 km2, and its population is 9,686 (2021). The Kaymakam is Yunus Kızılgüneş.

The district was established in 1990.

Composition
There is 1 municipality in Tut District:
Tut

There are 14 villages in Tut District:

 Akçatepe
 Boyundere
 Çiftlik
 Elçiler
 Havutlu
 Kaşlıca
 Köseli
 Meryemuşağı
 Öğütlü
 Tepecik
 Ünlüce
 Yalankoz
 Yaylımlı
 Yeşilyurt

References

Districts of Adıyaman Province